Sherman's March is the popular name of the Savannah Campaign conducted by General Sherman during the American Civil War.

Sherman's March may also refer to:

Sherman's March (1986 film), a documentary by Ross McElwee
Sherman's March (2000 film), a TV movie starring Reiko Aylesworth
Sherman's March (2007 film), a History Channel documentary